John William Hodkinson (29 December 1942 – 9 June 2013), also known as J.W. Hodkinson or J.W. Hodgkinson, was a British rock vocalist.

Hodkinson was born in Leigh, Lancashire, now in Greater Manchester, England. After performing as Johnny Goode, with Larry Parnes' "The Big New Rock 'n' Trad Spectacular", and billed as a "Teenage Idol" with Billy Raymond, Georgie Fame, Billy Fury and Jimmie Nicol, in 1961, he recorded, as Tony Allen, the first of a series of 45s for Philips, all with arrangements by Ivor Raymonde. In 1966, he sang the theme track for the United Artists spy thriller film Triple Cross, starring Christopher Plummer and Yul Brynner. In 1964, he joined The Shubdubs with Jimmie Nicol, Bob Garner, Johnny Harris, Quincy Davis, and Roger Coulam.

In the late 1960s, he became a founding member of the pioneering British jazz-rock band If, appearing on their first five albums. When the band's first line-up broke up, in 1972-3, he joined Darryl Way's Wolf, and appeared on the album Night Music (1974). 
 
In 1975, Hodkinson, alongside Guy Fletcher and Al Hodge, became a founder-member of the soft rock band Rogue.

Discography

As leader/co-leader
"Time to Swing" - 43361 BE
1961: "When Love Comes to Call" c/w "Mr. Happiness" - Philips PB 1117
1962: "There Is Always a First Time" - Philips 326539 BF
1963: "That Little Touch of Magic" - Philips BF 1252
1966: "Triple Cross" - United Artists

With If
1970: If 1
1970: If 2
1971: If 3
1972: If 4 
1972: Waterfall (U.S. version of If 4)

With Darryl Way's Wolf
1974: Night Music

With Rogue
1975: Fallen Angel
1977: Let It Go 
1979: Would You Let Your Daughter

References

1942 births
2013 deaths
English male singers
English rock singers
British soft rock musicians
People from Leigh, Greater Manchester
If (band) members